Sheppard J. "Shep" Solomon (born December 12, 1969 in New York City, New York, United States) is an American songwriter.

Biography
Solomon attended the Fiorello H. LaGuardia High School of Music & Art and Performing Arts in New York City. Upon graduation, he formed two bands, which were signed to EMI and SIRE respectively. During this time, Sheppard co-wrote material with other songwriters.  His first hit was Eternal's 1993 UK chart hit "Just a Step from Heaven".

Solomon decided to focus on songwriting full-time and went on to achieve 14 top 3 single positions in the United Kingdom and Europe, including his second UK number-one single, "Don't Stop Movin'" by S Club 7. This single also secured Solomon a BRIT Award for "Song of the Year".

Solomon returned to song writing in the United States, co-writing cuts with artists such as Britney Spears, Kelly Clarkson, Celine Dion, and Enrique Iglesias. He then went on to write Ryan Cabrera's "True"

Solomon wrote the song "Shiver" for Natalie Imbruglia which went on to be a #1 Pan European airplay hit and Paris Hilton's first single "Stars Are Blind" which was a worldwide top #5 single.

In 2011 Solomon's releases include  Wonderland's 'Not a Love Song,'(Mercury UK) One Direction's 'Tell Me a Lie,' (Syco UK) and J-Lo's 'Everybody's Girl' from the Love Album (Island Def Jam).

To date, Sheppard has had 140 of his songs recorded and released worldwide.

Discography

References

http://www.bernieshoot.fr/2019/02/when-sheppard-solomon-puts-his-hands-to-a-guitar.html
http://www.allmusic.com/artist/sheppard-solomon-mn0001059263
 https://www.discogs.com/artist/133980

1969 births
Songwriters from New York (state)
Living people
Fiorello H. LaGuardia High School alumni
Musicians from New York City
Jewish American songwriters
American male songwriters
21st-century American Jews